The Gila River Golf Classic was a golf tournament on the Nationwide Tour from 2001 to 2005. It was played at the Wild Horse Pass Resort's Whirlwind Golf Club on the Gila River Indian Community near Chandler, Arizona. The first two years it was played on the Devil's Claw course then shifted to the Cattail course for the final three years.

The purse in 2005 was US$450,000, with $81,000 going to the winner.

Winners

References
 

Former Korn Ferry Tour events
Golf in Arizona
Recurring sporting events established in 2001
Recurring sporting events disestablished in 2005
2001 establishments in Arizona
2005 disestablishments in Arizona
Gila River Indian Community